Battle of Kerch Strait may refer to:

 Battle of Kerch Strait (1774)
 Battle of Kerch Strait (1790)
 2018 Kerch Strait incident